William Neil McCasland is an astronautical engineer, retired United States Air Force major general, and former commander of Air Force Research Laboratory. He is currently the director of technology at Applied Technology Associates.

Early life and education 
McCasland grew up in an Air Force family, the son of Lieutenant William H. and Robin (née Chambless) McCasland. His father was killed in a flying accident when he was young, and his mother eventually remarried to another airman, Lieutenant William R. Casey.

McCasland went on to attend the United States Air Force Academy, graduating with a Bachelor of Science degree in astronautical engineering in 1979. He went on to receive a full scholarship from the Hertz foundation, and attended Massachusetts Institute of Technology for a Master's degree in aeronautical engineering estimation and controls in 1980. He returned to MIT in 1985 to complete a doctorate in astronautical engineering. He defended his dissertation "Sensor and Actuator Selection for Fault-Tolerant Control of Flexible Structures" in August, 1988. Dedicated to his late father, McCasland's thesis was supervised by Richard Battin, primary designer of the Apollo program guidance computer.

He later went on to attend the Air War College at Maxwell Air Force Base, Alabama, graduating in 1995, as well as the Advanced Program Manager's Course at the Defense Systems Management College on Fort Belvoir, Virginia. In 2004 he participated in the United States-Russia Security Program at the Kennedy School of Government at Harvard University.

Military career

Assignments 
After graduate school, McCasland served in Payload Systems Division with the Secretary of the Air Force Office of Special Projects-6 and 8 at Los Angeles Air Force Base, California until 1985, when he returned to MIT for a doctorate. After graduation he returned to Los Angeles AFB, this time as assistant director of Office of Special Projects-13. As a lieutenant, McCasland reportedly stood out among his peers, becoming one of just a handful of lower officers given large program leadership responsibilities for highly classified development units within what became the birth of Air Force satellite reconnaissance as it exists today.

In 1992 he moved to Buckley Air Force Base, Colorado, serving as director of mission planning for the Aerospace Data Facility through 1994. After a hiatus in 1995 to attend Air War College, he returned to Buckley to command the operations squadron at the ADF through 1997.

After Buckley he returned to Los Angeles AFB this time spending three years as the Chief Engineer of the Navstar GPS Joint Program Office, the controlling authority for the Global Positioning System for government, commercial, and consumer applications. In 2000 he took control of the Space Based Laser Project Office at LA AFB as Systems Program Director, before moving to Kirtland Air Force Base, New Mexico a year later to begin a three-year stint as materiel wing director, Air Force Research Laboratory Space Vehicles Directorate, and commander of the Phillips Research Site. Several of these postings involved close work with the National Reconnaissance Office. In 2004 McCasland became vice commander of the Ogden Air Logistics Center, a facility attached to Hill Air Force Base, Utah, spending a year leading operations before returning yet again to LA AFB as vice commander of the Space and Missile Systems Center.

In 2007 McCasland was assigned to the Pentagon as director of space acquisition within the Office of the Under Secretary of the Air Force. In 2009 he was promoted to director of special programs within the Office of the Under Secretary of Defense for Acquisition, Technology and Logistics. Serving as director of special programs also made McCasland executive secretary for the Special Access Program Oversight Committee (SAPOC), in charge of the oversight and review body with full purview of all of America's most sensitive and secretive knowledge, capabilities, and programs.

In May 2011 McCasland left Washington for his final posting, assuming command of Air Force Research Laboratory at Wright-Patterson Air Force Base, Ohio, a position he held until his retirement in October 2013. At AFRL he led billions of dollars in advanced materials sciences and future weapons research across one of the largest scientific centers in the Department of Defense.

Awards and decorations

Post-military career 
McCasland is currently director of technology at Applied Technology Associates, an Albuquerque, New Mexico based subsidiary of Arlington, Virginia based BlueHalo, a defense conglomerate operating in the areas of space warfare, directed energy, missile defense, cyber and C4ISR.

Since 2013 McCasland has been an associate fellow of the American Institute of Aeronautics and Astronautics.

In June 2019, McCasland joined the board of trustees for Riverside Research, a not-for-profit "chartered to advance scientific research for the benefit of the United States government and in the public interest".

McCasland is a senior member of the Institute of Electrical and Electronics Engineers (IEEE).

Involvement in unidentified flying object disclosure 
McCasland's involvement with the topic of unidentified flying objects became public when WikiLeaks released an archive of Hillary Clinton Campaign chairman John Podesta's email records in 2016. The archive of documents was obtained from a data breach by Fancy Bear, a hacking group which the United States Government alleges is associated with military intelligence assets of the Russian Federation. McCasland is the subject of an email dated January 25, 2016 from Blink-182 frontman Tom DeLonge to Podesta in which DeLonge says of McCasland: He mentioned he's a "skeptic", he's not. I've been working with him for four months. I just got done giving him a four hour presentation on the entire project a few weeks ago. Trust me, the advice is already been happening on how to do all this. He just has to say that out loud, but he is very, very aware- as he was in charge of all of the stuff. When Roswell crashed, they shipped it to the laboratory at Wright Patterson Air Force Base. General McCasland was in charge of that exact laboratory up to a couple years ago. He not only knows what I'm trying to achieve, he helped assemble my advisory team. He's a very important man.McCasland is also the recipient of another email, this time directly from Podesta, inviting him to a Google Hangouts meeting with DeLonge and Podesta. Also CC’ed on the invitation were Rob Weiss, Chief of Lockheed Martin's Skunkworks Division and Air Force Major General Michael Carey.

Podesta's involvement in UFO disclosure initiatives is well documented throughout his service in both the Clinton and Obama administrations, while DeLonge lead To The Stars Academy of Arts and Sciences, a nonprofit associated with the UFO disclosure movement. The pair's collaboration on seemingly fringe science led some to speculate that DeLonge was being manipulated by public officials like McCasland into developing a UFO cover story for new classified American defense technology of a terrestrial origin. Other speculation focused on a relationship between McCasland and Michael Duggin, an Australian-American scientist with AFRL at Kirtland Air Force Base, New Mexico who spent years of his Air Force career in research on UFO phenomena. Duggin was an assistant to J. Allen Hynek, an astronomer who led the Air Force's infamous Project Blue Book, one of the first investigations of reported encounters with UFO's by the United States Government.

Personal life 
Early in his Air Force career McCasland married San Diego native Susan Wilkerson. He lives in Albuquerque, New Mexico.

References

External links 
 Air Force Biography

United States Air Force Academy alumni
Air Force Research Laboratory people
MIT School of Engineering alumni
Ufologists
1950s births
Living people